Arcor is an Argentine food company specialized in confectionery. The firm was founded on July 5, 1951 in the city of Arroyito, Córdoba. It specializes in the production of foodstuff, sugar and chocolate confectionery, cookies and ice cream in 39 industrial plants throughout Latin America. It is the world's top producer of hard candies and the tenth-biggest confectionery manufacturer overall. In Argentina, Arcor is the largest producer of processed foods, and its products are exported to over 120 countries.

In 2012 Arcor ranked 1st amongst the 100 most valuable companies of Argentina, according to the opinion of CEOs, financial analysts and journalists specialised in economics.

History 

Arcor was created on 5 July 1951 when a group of entrepreneurs, sons of Italian immigrants, opened the first candy factory in Arroyito, a city in Córdoba Province. The partners and buyers of the 10,000 m2 factory were members of the Pagani Family: Amos, Renzo, Fulvio, and Elio, who decided to call the recently formed company Arcor, a name made from the combination of the first two letters of the word "Arroyito" and the first three of "Córdoba". Apart from the Pagani family members, there were other partners that totalised 23 shareholders.

Arcor first export its products to the United States in 1968. The company sent milk candy that were carried with no refrigeration. As a result, the merchandise arrived in the U.S. totally melted. Arcor compensated their North American partners covering all costs.

In 1958, Arcor reached 60,000 kg of daily confectionery production and started producing different product lines. Arcor continued its expansion throughout South America by opening in 1995 a large candy manufacturing plant in Peru.

In order to consolidate its position in the market, in 1993 Arcor bought "Chocolates Águila", a traditional chocolate manufacturer of Argentina established in 1880 by Abel Saint and mostly known for its chocolate bars. Arcor expanded the Aguila brand adding several products (such as ice creams, alfajores, and even candies) to its line. Between the 1930s and the 1970s, the former Chocolate Aguila company developed a huge variety of products, manufacturing and commercialising more than 100 different items in its factory located in Barracas.

Arcor acquired "Noel & Cia. Ltda. S.A.", a traditional company founded in 1847 by Spanish immigrant Carlos Noel, which had a reputatition for its jellies and chocolate, in 1994.

Four years later, Arcor acquired "Lía", a cookie manufacturer and inaugurated the Arcor Museum in Arroyito. One year later, Arcor Group acquired "Dos en Uno", a Chilean leading company of sugar and chocolate confectionery, with a strong presence in the region.

By 2003, Arcor had incomes for US$800 million and had 13,000 employees (9,000 in Argentina). In 2004, Arcor associated with French conglomerate Danone to take over Bagley, a local producer of crackers and other cookies. Bagley had been acquired by Danone in 1994. With this partnership, Arcor–Danone became the largest cookies manufacturer in South America, with a turnover of US$300 million. Arcor owned 51% of Bagley, and Danone 49%. This alliance was only for the cookies market, with both companies carrying on the rest of their business separately.

The political and economic crises which the large Argentine agro-industrial companies suffered by the end of 2001, hit Arcor badly. Arcor was able to restructure its debt on December 1, 2008 with up to 5-year financing. Nevertheless, during those years Arcor acquired Benvenuto SACI, the company that owned La Campagnola brand, for US$40 million in 2005. Through this acquisition, Arcor incorporated some of La Campagnola canned products such as tuna, tomatoes, peas, and dips. At the moment of the purchase, Benvenuto employed 2,000 people that became part of the Arcor staff. Arcor totalised a total of 14,000 employees in Argentina by then.

Arcor Group settled in Europe in 2002 through the opening of commercial offices in Barcelona, Spain.

Brands and products 
 Arcor Group Foodstuff Division participates in more than 12 categories, including: jams and marmalades, fruit paste, sauces and canned tomatoes, tomato purees, canned vegetables, canned fish, beverages, mixes, polenta, dressings, oils and fruits, among others.

The following is a list containing the brands and its products, manufactured and/or commercialized by Arcor:

Notes

See also 
 La Serenísima (subsidiary)
 Melville Sewell Bagley

References

External links

 

a
a
a
a
a
Arcor
a
Argentine brands